Mi Vida may refer to:

Mi Vida (album), a 1982 album by José José
Mi Vida: Grandes Éxitos, a 1998 album by Julio Iglesias
"Mi Vida", 2000 song by Manu Chao from Próxima Estación: Esperanza
Mi Vida (film), a 2019 Dutch film
Mi Vida (Kendji Girac album), 2020